Daniel Penese (born 1 December 1989) in New Zealand is a former professional rugby league footballer who last played in the  for the Wyong Roos in the New South Wales Cup competition.

Early life
Penese was educated at Patrician Brothers' College Blacktown and played his junior rugby league for the St Mary's Saints before being signed by the Penrith Panthers.

Playing career
Penese agreed to a deal with the St. George Illawarra Dragons for the 2011 NRL season, although he did not get an opportunity in first grade. Penese then signed a new deal with the Parramatta Eels from 2012 onwards, spending all season with their feeder team, the Wentworthville Magpies. Penese then made his way overseas to France to play for Elite One Championship team Sporting Olympique Avignon.

In 2014, Penese joined the Wyong Roos in the New South Wales Cup.

In 2015, Penese played for St Mary's in the Penrith Rugby League Competition.

References

External links
Penrith Panthers profile

1989 births
Living people
New Zealand rugby league players
Expatriate sportspeople in Australia
Expatriate sportspeople in France
New Zealand sportspeople of Samoan descent
Penrith Panthers players
Rugby league locks
Rugby league players from Auckland
Rugby league second-rows
Sporting Olympique Avignon players
Windsor Wolves players
Wentworthville Magpies players
Wyong Roos players